This is the list of Indonesia Football player transfers. This list is for 2014 Indonesia Super League and 2014 Liga Indonesia Premier Division season.

Since the 2014 edition, Indonesian FA has applied a new restriction as known as "3+1" format, in which at least 1 of 4 foreign players in every club are originated from Asian countries. Only 3 of them are allowed to play together in a match.

Winter transfers 
For Super League winter transfers closed on 28 February and the foreign players registered closed on 15 March 2014.

For Premier Division winter transfers opened on 26 March and closed on 30 April 2014.

Summer transfers 
For Super League summer transfers opened on May 5 and closed in June 2014.

For Premier Division summer transfers opened on 19 May and closed on 6 June 2014.

Notes

References

2014 in Indonesian football
Indonesian
Lists of Indonesian football transfers
Indonesia